The Mayor of Kyzyl is the head of the Government of Kyzyl, Tyvan Republic, Russia. The current incumbent is Karim Baylak-oolovich Sagaan-ool.

References

See also
Kyzyl
Russia
Tyva Republic
Head of the Republic of Tuva
Karim Baylak-oolovich Sagaan-ool

Mayors of Kyzyl